The 1983–84 Gonzaga Bulldogs men's basketball team represented Gonzaga University of Spokane, Washington, in the 1983–84 NCAA Division I men's basketball season. Led by third-year head coach Jay Hillock, the Bulldogs managed a  overall record  and played their home games on campus at the John F. Kennedy Memorial Pavilion.

Without a conference tournament, Gonzaga's season was not quite enough to qualify for the 53-team NCAA tournament,  went to champion  In earlier non-conference games, Gonzaga met Inland Empire rival Washington State of the Pac-10 at the Spokane Coliseum in December and the Cougars made a late basket and won  Two weeks later, Gonzaga outscored WSU by a point in overtime at the Far West Classic in Portland to halt their losing streak to the Cougars at eleven  A week later, Gonzaga broke a four-game losing streak to the other Palouse rival, the 

Two key senior scorers were lost to injury early in the season: swingman Bryce McPhee played in only six games due to a broken leg  and forward Jason Van Nort was sidelined in early January with ongoing issues after knee  Both redshirted and returned as fifth-year seniors in the following season.

With the active roster depleted to eight players, the coaching staff dipped into the intramural ranks for help and added sophomore  to the Zags'  The  guard saw action in two home games and made both of his free throw attempts, met with great appreciation from the 

This Gonzaga team is largely remembered for Spokane native  the senior point guard from Gonzaga Prep was a three-year starter and the team leader throughout  and was the conference player of the year. Despite flying well below the national radar for the majority of his collegiate career, Stockton was selected 16th overall in the 1984 NBA draft by the  where he played nineteen seasons.

Roster

Schedule and results

|-
!colspan=9 style=| Non-Conference Regular Season

|-
!colspan=9 style=| WCAC Regular Season

References

External links
Sports Reference – Gonzaga Bulldogs men's basketball – 1983-84 season

Gonzaga Bulldogs men's basketball seasons
Gonzaga
1983 in sports in Washington (state)
1984 in sports in Washington (state)